Cymbium gracile is a species of sea snail, a marine gastropod mollusk in the family Volutidae, the volutes. Its class is Gastropoda Orthogastropoda.

Description

Distribution

References

Volutidae
Gastropods described in 1830